"Arnold Layne" is a song by English rock band Pink Floyd. Released on 10 March 1967, it was the band's first single release. It was written by Syd Barrett.

Lyrics
The song's title character is a transvestite whose strange hobby is stealing women's lingerie, undergarments from washing lines. According to Roger Waters, "Arnold Layne" was actually based on a real person: "Both my mother and Syd's mother had students as lodgers because there was a girls' college up the road so there were constantly great lines of bras and knickers on our washing lines and 'Arnold' or whoever he was, had bits off our washing lines."

Recording and production
In January Pink Floyd went to Sound Techniques studio in Chelsea, where they had previously recorded two songs for Tonite Let's All Make Love in London. Here, the band recorded "Arnold Layne" and a few other songs: "Matilda Mother", "Chapter 24", "Interstellar Overdrive" and "Let's Roll Another One" (which was renamed to "Candy and a Currant Bun", at the lead of Waters).

Nick Mason said of why "Arnold Layne" was chosen over the other songs: "We knew we wanted to be rock'n'roll stars and we wanted to make singles, so it seemed the most suitable song to condense into 3 minutes without losing too much". The band had tried to re-record "Arnold Layne" after signing up with EMI, but the Joe Boyd version from January was released instead. The song would be Boyd's last production for the band.

Boyd mentioned in several interviews over the years that "Arnold Layne" regularly ran for ten to fifteen minutes in concert (with extended instrumental passages), but the band knew that it had to be shortened for use as a single. He has also said it was a complex recording involving some tricky editing, recalling that the middle instrumental section with Richard Wright's organ solo was recorded as an edit piece and spliced into the song for the final mix.

The backing track for "Arnold Layne" was recorded in multiple takes on 4-track tape, the third take being the best. Drums and bass were recorded on track one, electric guitar on track two, keyboard on track three, and acoustic guitar on track four. It was then bounced onto one track on another 4-track reel so vocals could be overdubbed. This was done across multiple takes where take seven became the master.

Both "Arnold Layne" and "Candy and a Currant Bun" were mixed into mono for the single. Neither have ever been given a stereo mix, although the four-track master tapes still exist in the EMI tape archive.

Music videos

A black and white promotional film of "Arnold Layne" was made in late February 1967, directed by Derek Nice and featuring members of the band dressing up, dismembering and carrying around a mannequin on a beach, filmed at East Wittering, West Sussex. One sequence employs reverse motion. This promo, made for £2,000, was meant to be screened on 3 April 1967 for the BBC's Top of the Pops show, but was cancelled when the single dropped down the chart. Another promotional film was recorded for the song, this time filmed on 29 April 1967, near St Michael's Church in Highgate. The film is the only known footage of Barrett lip-synching to the song.

Release

The single was released on 10 March 1967 in the UK, backed by "Candy and a Currant Bun". The band is credited as "The Pink Floyd" on the single, although the determiner the would be dropped for subsequent releases. The band's management, Blackhill Enterprises, had paid to boost the single's chart position, as manager Andrew King stated: "We spent a couple of hundred quid, [...] trying to buy it into the charts. The management did that, not EMI." However, despite reaching number 20 in the UK singles chart, the song's unusual transvestism theme attracted the ire of pirate radio station Radio London, which deemed the song was too far removed from "normal" society for its listeners, before eventually banning it from radio airplay altogether.

The song later appeared on the budget 1971 compilation album Relics, their 1983 compilation album Works and their 2001 retrospective best-of, Echoes: The Best of Pink Floyd. Both sides of the single appear on the first volume 1965–1967: Cambridge St/ation in the 2016 Early Years box set, and on a replica seven-inch single also included in the set.

Track listing

All tracks written by Syd Barrett, excluding Interstellar Overdrive which was written by Syd Barrett, Roger Waters, Rick Wright and Nick Mason.

1967 single

1967 French EP

Personnel

Pink Floyd 
Syd Barrett – guitar, vocals
Richard Wright – Farfisa organ, backing vocals
Roger Waters – bass
Nick Mason – drums

David Gilmour version

David Gilmour, during his solo tour promoting On an Island, unexpectedly added the song to the setlist near the end of the American tour on show of 17 April 2006 at the Oakland Paramount Theatre. This version of the song was sung by Richard Wright and remained in the setlist until 31 May.

On 26 December 2006, two live recordings of the song, from Gilmour's On an Island shows at the Royal Albert Hall were released as a live single, which peaked at No. 19 on the UK singles chart. One version had guest vocals by David Bowie. Both versions are featured on Gilmour's DVD/BD, Remember That Night (Bowie's version on disc one and Wright's version as a bonus on disc two).

Track listing
All tracks written by Syd Barrett.

"Arnold Layne" (with David Bowie) – 3:30
"Arnold Layne" (with Richard Wright) – 3:23
"Dark Globe" – 2:23

Personnel
David Gilmour – Fender Telecaster electric guitar, backing vocals (tracks 1–2), acoustic guitar, lead vocals (track 3)
David Bowie - lead vocals (track 1)
Richard Wright – organ (tracks 1–2), lead vocals (track 2), backing vocals (track 1)
Jon Carin – keyboards, backing vocals (tracks 1–2)
Phil Manzanera – guitar, backing vocals (tracks 1–2)
Steve DiStanislao – drums (tracks 1–2)
Guy Pratt – bass guitar, backing vocals (tracks 1–2)

Pink Floyd 2007 performance

On 10 May 2007, Pink Floyd, featuring Gilmour (guitar), Mason (drums) and Wright (lead vocals and keyboards), augmented by Jon Carin (keyboards, vocals) and Andy Bell from Ride/Oasis (bass guitar) performed for what was the band's final live performance, at The Barbican, London, for The Madcap's Last Laugh, a tribute show for Syd Barrett organised by Joe Boyd. At the end of the show, they were introduced as surprise guests and Wright sang his band's first single one final time. This also saw the final performance by Pink Floyd with Gilmour now concentrating on his solo career, Mason on his motor racing, while Wright died in September 2008.

Other versions
 Robyn Hitchcock covered the song on his 2020 album The Man Downstairs: Demos & Rarities.
 Arjen Anthony Lucassen covered this song on his 1996 cover album Strange Hobby. The album's title is taken from this song as well.
 The Boomtown Rats also recorded a cover.
The Damned have also recorded several versions, but none have been commercially released.
Nick Mason's Saucerful of Secrets recorded a live rendition at the Roundhouse, released in 2020 on their live album Live at the Roundhouse.

References

Pink Floyd songs
David Gilmour songs
1967 debut singles
LGBT-related songs
Songs about cross-dressing
Songs written by Syd Barrett
Song recordings produced by Joe Boyd
Song recordings produced by David Gilmour
Richard Wright (musician) songs
1967 songs
Columbia Graphophone Company singles
Psychedelic pop songs